Til Dovre Faller is the second release the Norwegian folk metal band Glittertind. It was released on Norway's constitution day, May 17, 2005 through Karmageddon Media, 100 years after Norway's independence from Sweden in 1905. The record was originally intended to be a full-length album. However, to reach the deadline for this symbolic release-date it came out as a seven-track mini-album.

The record was dedicated to freedom, democracy and the people fighting for it throughout the years of Norwegian history. Norway got its constitution in 1814 and this album lasts for 18 minutes and 14 seconds in total - 18:14. The expression "Until the Mountains of Dovre Falls" was something the people who wrote the constitution swore to each other when signing it.

Finntroll member Skrymer did the cover-artwork and Finntroll member Trollhorn played synths on this record. All other instruments were handled by Torbjørn Sandvik.

Statement in 2009 re-release
In the beginning of the album booklet for the 2009 re-release, the following political statement is made:

Track listing

References

Glittertind (band) albums
2005 albums
Karmageddon Media albums